The Wishkah River is a tributary of the Chehalis River in the U.S. state of Washington. It flows south through the county and empties into the Chehalis at Aberdeen.

The name "Wishkah" is an adaptation of the Chehalis word hwish-kahl, meaning "stinking water".

In popular culture

Nirvana
The Nirvana song "Something in the Way" refers to the experiences of lead singer Kurt Cobain while living under a bridge on the river after dropping out of high school and being kicked out of his mother's home. According to his biographer Charles R. Cross, however, this was largely a myth created by Cobain himself. One third of his cremated remains were scattered in the river after his death.

From the Muddy Banks of the Wishkah is a live album compiled by the band. It was released on October 1, 1996, two and a half years after Cobain's death, and features live performances recorded from 1989 to 1994.

See also
List of rivers of Washington

References

Rivers of Washington (state)
Rivers of Grays Harbor County, Washington